Leiopython fredparkeri, the Karimui Basin whitelip python or Karimui Basin white-lipped python, is a species of snake in the family Pythonidae. It is endemic to New Guinea. It was first described by Wulf Schleip in 2008.

Etymology
The specific name, fredparkeri, is in honor of Australian naturalist Fred Parker (born 1941).

Geographic range
It is found in mainland Papua New Guinea.

References

Pythonidae
Snakes of New Guinea
Endemic fauna of Papua New Guinea
Endemic fauna of New Guinea
Reptiles described in 2008